This is an incomplete List of ghost towns in Iowa.

 Big Spring
 Bryantsburg
 Buxton
 Buchanan
 Caledonia
 Civil Bend
 Clarkson
 Conover
 Cordova
 Donnan
 Doris
 Dudley (Polk County)
 Dudley (Wapello County)
 Dunreath
 Elkport
 Fifield
 Herring
 Hinkletown
 Howell
 Green Island
 Griffinsville
 Iowaville
 Ivanhoe
 Knowlton
 Lakewood
 Littleport
 Midway (Johnson County)
 Motor
 Mount Pisgah
 National
 Oradell
 Percy
 Queen City
 Red Rock
 River Junction
 Shady Grove
 Siegel
 Strahan
 Stumpville
 Unique
 White Pigeon  
 Yatton

Notes and references

 
Iowa
Ghost towns